Katarzyna Wilk (born 3 January 1982 in Lubin, Poland) is a Polish contemporary rhythm and blues singer, more commonly known as Kasia Wilk.

In 2008, she began her solo career with the hit single "Pierwszy raz" which reached position 51 on the Polish National Top 50 music chart. Previously she was a vocalist for KTO TO, Dreamland, and Groovestreet. She has also collaborated with Mezo. In 2004, she received an award at the Polish National Song Festival in memory of Anna Jantar.

Discography

Solo albums

Collaborative albums

References

External links
 Official website

1982 births
Living people
People from Lubin
Polish hip hop singers
Polish pop singers
21st-century Polish singers
21st-century Polish women singers